The  are a Japanese women's softball team based in Kariya, Aichi. The Shining Vega compete in the Japan Diamond Softball League (JD.League) as a member of the league's West Division.

History
The Shining Vega were founded in 1952, as Toyota Industries softball team.

The Japan Diamond Softball League (JD.League) was founded in 2022, and the Shining Vega became part of the new league as a member of the West Division.

Roster

References

External links
 
 Toyota Industries Shining Vega - JD.League
 

Japan Diamond Softball League
Women's softball teams in Japan
Sports teams in Aichi Prefecture